Geoffrey Colvin is the author of Humans Are Underrated: What High Achievers Know That Brilliant Machines Never Will; Talent is Overrated: What Really Separates World-Class Performers from Everybody Else; and The Upside of the Downturn: Management Strategies for Difficult Times. He is co-author of Angel Customers and Demon Customers: Discover Which is Which and Turbocharge Your Stock. He is a Senior Editor at Large for Fortune Magazine.

Education

Colvin obtained a degree in economics from Harvard and received his MBA from New York University's Stern School of Business.

Talent is Overrated
The thesis of Talent is Overrated is that the greatest achievers succeed through lifelong "deliberate practice." Colvin characterizes it as “activity designed specifically to improve performance, often with a teacher’s help; it pushes the practicer just beyond, but not way beyond, his or her current limits; it can be repeated a lot; feedback on results is continuously available; it’s highly demanding mentally, whether the activity is purely intellectual, such as chess or business-related activities, or heavily physical, such as sports; and it isn’t much fun". "Some 40 years of research show that specific, innate gifts are not necessary for great performance.

Humans Are Underrated 
Humans Are Underrated argues that as technology advances with increasing speed, the most valuable skills in the economy will be skills of deep human interaction – empathy, creative problem-solving in groups, storytelling – and that developing these skills will be crucial to the futures of individuals, companies, and nations. The book suggests that while demand for such skills is rising, supply may be falling as our increasingly digital lives cause these skills to atrophy. The imbalance of supply and demand, Colvin concludes, is making these skills even more valuable.

With Karen Gibbs, Colvin was co-anchor of Wall Street Week with Fortune on PBS for three years, successor of Louis Rukeyser. His daily reports "Inside Business" and “Fortune Business Update” are heard on the CBS Radio Network, where he has made more than 10,000 broadcasts.

Colvin is the brother of singer/songwriter Shawn Colvin.

References

· · "Allan Sloan and Geoff Colvin". Q & A. Retrieved 1 December 2014.

· · "Biography of Geoff Colvin". Phi Theta Kappa. Retrieved 25 October 2013.

· · Colvin, Geoff, Talent is Overrated.

· · Fortune Magazine Fortune Magazine. "Editorial Bios : Geoff Colvin".

· ·  http://postcards.blogs.fortune.cnn.com/2008/10/21/how-to-stretch-your-talent/   

Footnotes

External links 
https://www.youtube.com/user/GeoffColvin/videos
 Appearances on C-SPAN 
 C-SPAN Q&A interview      with Colvin and Allan Sloan, September 30, 2012

Year of birth missing (living people)
Living people
People from Vermillion, South Dakota
American business writers
Fortune (magazine) people
Harvard College alumni
New York University Stern School of Business alumni